Garra dunsirei, the Tawi Atair garra, is a species of ray-finned fish in the family Cyprinidae. This cavefish lacks pigmentation and is found only in pools near Tawi Atair in Dhofar, Oman. Unlike the cave form of the related Oman garra (G. barreimiae), G. dunsirei has normal eyes.

Sources

Cave fish
Garra
Fish described in 1987
Taxonomy articles created by Polbot